Noël Segers (born 21 December 1959) is a former Belgian racing cyclist. He rode in four editions of the Tour de France between 1983 and 1992 and the 1987 Vuelta a España.

References

External links

1959 births
Living people
Belgian male cyclists
People from Ninove
Cyclists from East Flanders